Loyalhanna Creek is a  long tributary of the Kiskiminetas River in Westmoreland County in the U.S. state of Pennsylvania. The stream is a popular destination for canoeing and recreational trout fishing.

Etymology 

The creek derives its name from the eighteenth-century village of Layalhanning, an important Delaware Indian crossroads settlement located at the site where Fort Ligonier was built, in present Ligonier, Pennsylvania. The village was settled shortly after the Delaware left the Susquehanna River area in 1727. Layalhanning means "the middle stream" in the Delaware language— "lawel" or "lawell" (middle); "hanna" (a river or stream); "ing" (at the place of).

Variant names
According to the Geographic Names Information System, it has also been known historically as: 
 Leyelhanna Creek
 Loyal Hanna Creek

Course 

Loyalhanna rises from Laurel Ridge in southeastern Westmoreland County, north of Donegal and flows NNE, along the southeastern side of Chestnut Ridge. Approximately 5 mi (8 km) northwest of Ligonier it turns northwest, cutting through Chestnut Ridge and passing through Latrobe. From Latrobe, it flows NNW, passing through Loyalhanna Lake reservoir and joins with the Conemaugh River to form the Kiskiminetas River at Saltsburg. The creek lies about midway between the Juniata River to the east and the Ohio River to the west, and about halfway between the Conemaugh River to the north and the Youghiogheny River to the south.

Watershed 

Decades before the 2000s, the lower end of the creek, beginning above Latrobe, was colored red due to acid from local mines. Rocks in the area are still stained red from the effects. In subsequent years, with the growth of  environmental sensitivity, a remediation pond was installed near Saint Vincent College that removes 90 percent of the iron oxide from the water.

Claims of Bigfoot sightings 

Sam Sherry, of Wilpen, claimed to have encountered a Bigfoot while night fishing along Loyalhanna Creek on May 17, 1987. Sherry gained notice from Bigfoot enthusiasts and spent much of his life investigating the phenomenon in the area.

Additional Images

See also

 List of rivers of Pennsylvania
 List of tributaries of the Allegheny River

References

External links

U.S. Geological Survey: PA stream gaging stations
Loyalhanna Dam pictures
U.S. Army Corps of Engineers: Loyalhanna Lake

Rivers of Pennsylvania
Tributaries of the Kiskiminetas River
Rivers of Westmoreland County, Pennsylvania